Dr N. D. Sundaravadivelu (Nayyadupakkam Duraiswamy Sundaravadivelu ) (1912–1993) was the Vice Chancellor of University of Madras, India, serving for 2 terms. 

Earlier he served as educational adviser to the government of Tamil Nadu and was Director of Public Instruction for several decades. He was the main architect of the midday meal scheme for schoolchildren introduced during K. Kamaraj's chief ministership. He brought in an "educational revolution" in Tamil Nadu for which he was awarded the Padma Shri by the Government of India.

References 

1912 births
1993 deaths
Academic staff of the University of Madras
20th-century Indian educational theorists
Vice Chancellors of the University of Madras
Recipients of the Padma Shri in literature & education